The 55th British Academy Film Awards, given by the British Academy of Film and Television Arts, took place on 24 February 2002 and honoured the best films of 2001.

The Lord of the Rings: The Fellowship of the Ring won Best Film, Best Director for Peter Jackson, Best Makeup and Hair, and Best Visual Effects. Russell Crowe won Best Actor for A Beautiful Mind, which also won Best Supporting Actress for Jennifer Connelly. Judi Dench won Best Actress for Iris and Jim Broadbent won Best Supporting Actor for Moulin Rouge!. Gosford Park, directed by Robert Altman, was voted Outstanding British Film of 2001. This ceremony is also notable for Eddie Murphy's nomination for his voice role as Donkey in Shrek, to date the only voice-over performance ever nominated in BAFTA history.

Winners and nominees

Statistics

Russell Crowe controversy
After winning the BAFTA Award for Best Actor in a Leading Role, Russell Crowe gave a speech in which he quoted a poem by Patrick Kavanagh. When the ceremony was broadcast, Crowe was enraged that the poem was cut. He blamed the producer, Malcolm Gerrie, and confronted him about it. It was reported that the confrontation got physical and there was speculation that it would cost him the Academy Award for Best Actor; Crowe later apologized and ultimately lost the Oscar to Denzel Washington for Training Day.

The following poem that was cut is four lines:

"To be a poet and not know the trade,
To be a lover and repel all women;
Twin ironies by which great saints are made,
The agonising pincer-jaws of heaven."

See also
 74th Academy Awards
 27th César Awards
 7th Critics' Choice Awards
 54th Directors Guild of America Awards
 15th European Film Awards
 59th Golden Globe Awards
 22nd Golden Raspberry Awards
 6th Golden Satellite Awards
 16th Goya Awards
 17th Independent Spirit Awards
 7th Lumières Awards
 13th Producers Guild of America Awards
 28th Saturn Awards
 8th Screen Actors Guild Awards
 54th Writers Guild of America Awards

References

Film055
British Academy Film Awards
British Academy Film Awards
February 2002 events in the United Kingdom
2002 in London
2001 awards in the United Kingdom